The Tsifteteli, is a rhythm and dance of Anatolia and the Balkans. In Turkish the word means "double stringed", taken from the violin playing style that is practiced in this kind of music. There are suggestions that the dance existed in ancient Greece, known as the Aristophanic dance Cordax, even though such a thesis is not fully evident. Furthermore, it is historically never spotted in Greece before the Greek-Turkish population exchange of 1923, and no dance in native Greek tradition shows similarities with the specific dance. Nowadays it is to be found not only in Greece and Turkey, but also in the whole of the Southeastern Mediterranean region..

See also 
Music of Cyprus 
Music of Greece
Music of Turkey
Music of Southeastern Europe

References

European folk dances
Arabic music
Folk music genres
Armenian dances
Armenian music
Assyrian dances
Balkan music
Belly dance
Greek music
Greek dances
Macedonian music
Middle Eastern dances
Turkish dances
Turkish music
Turkish words and phrases